Grow Up is the second album by London-based post punk band Desperate Journalist. It was released on 24 March 2017 on Fierce Panda Records. The first single, "Hollow", was released in October 2016. The second single, "Resolution", was released in January 2017 and has been playlisted on BBC Radio 6 Music. "Be Kind" was released as the third single in March 2017, just prior to the album's release. A fourth single, "Why Are You So Boring" was released in June 2017.

The band's singer Jo Bevan describes the album as being about "figuring out what being an adult is supposed to mean". The cover is a photograph of Bevan "at the start of [her] (ongoing) phase of teenage angst".

Reception

Grow Up received positive reviews from critics upon release. On Metacritic, the album holds a score of 79/100 based on 6 reviews, indicating "generally favorable reviews."

Track listing

Personnel
Desperate Journalist
Jo Bevan – vocals
Robert Hardy – guitar, piano
Simon Drowner – bass
Caroline Helbert – drums, percussion, backing vocals

Production
Desperate Journalist and Keith TOTP – production
Jonny Solway – engineering
Jonny Solway with Desperate Journalist – mixing
Pete Maher – mastering

B-sides
From "Hollow"
"Hollow" (Medium Wave remix)

From "Resolution"
"Bruce" (lyrics Springsteen)

References

2017 albums
Desperate Journalist albums
Fierce Panda Records albums